Cameron Orr (born 2 April 1995) is an Australian rugby union player who competes for the Melbourne Rebels in Super Rugby. His usual position is prop.

Orr was originally part of the Waratahs' Generation Blue Academy and he played for the Greater Sydney Rams in the National Rugby Championship. In July 2016, Orr signed for English club Gloucester Rugby to play in the Aviva Premiership from the 2016-17 season.

In February 2018, Orr returned home to Australia to play for Western Force as part of the World Series Rugby invitational matches and the upcoming 2018 National Rugby Championship season.

Orr represented Australia U20s in both the 2014 and 2015 IRB World Junior Championships, held in New Zealand and Italy respectively.

Super Rugby statistics

References

External links
Gloucester Rugby Profile
Rugby AU Profile

1995 births
Living people
Australian rugby union players
Australian expatriate sportspeople in England
Greater Sydney Rams players
Gloucester Rugby players
Rugby union players from Sydney
Expatriate rugby union players in England
Australian expatriate rugby union players
Western Force players
Melbourne Rebels players
Rugby union props